Coquitlam is a city in British Columbia, Canada.

Coquitlam may also refer to:

Places
Coquitlam 1, properly known as Coquitlam Indian Reserve No. 1, and Indian reserve on the Coquitlam River
Coquitlam 2, an Indian reserve in British Columbia, Canada
Coquitlam (electoral district), a former provincial electoral district in British Columbia, Canada
Coquitlam-Moody, a former provincial electoral district in British Columbia, Canada
Coquitlam-Maillardville, a provincial electoral district in British Columbia, Canada
Port Coquitlam, a city in British Columbia, Canada

Natural formations
Coquitlam Mountain, a mountain east of Coquitlam Lake in British Columbia, Canada
Coquitlam Range, a range of mountains including Coquitlam Mountain
Coquitlam River, a river in British Columbia, Canada
Coquitlam Dam, a dam on the river
Coquitlam Lake, a reservoir formed by the dam

Other uses
Coquitlam Indian Band, aka Coquitlam First Nation
Coquitlam Town Centre, a shopping mall and surrounding area in the city of Coquitlam, British Columbia